Andrew Mackiewicz (born 12 December 1995) is an American sabre fencer. He competed in the 2020 Summer Olympics.

See also

 List of Pennsylvania State University Olympians

References

External links
 Penn State Nittany Lions bio

1995 births
Living people
People from Westwood, Massachusetts
Fencers at the 2020 Summer Olympics
American male sabre fencers
Olympic fencers of the United States
Penn State Nittany Lions fencers